QFG may refer to:
Quest for Glory, an adventure RPG video game series
Quest for Glory: So You Want to Be a Hero, the first game of the series
QFG, a signal in Q code for "Am I overheard?"
The IATA code for Eqalugaarsuit Heliport
"Qualified For Gold Medal Game" in sporting events where medals are awarded